Arthur Ahmed is a Ghanaian politician and member of the Seventh Parliament of the Fourth Republic of Ghana representing the Okaikwei South Constituency in the Greater Accra Region on the ticket of the New Patriotic Party.

Early life and education 
He comes from Nsuta Mampong in the Ashanti Region.  His Highest education is GCE A Level from Abuakwa State College in 1992.

Employment 
He is the managing director of Ackwell Entreprise and contracts works.

Politics 
He was elected Member of Parliament for Okaikwei South Constituency from 2013 and was re-elected in 2016.

Marital status 
He is married with three children.

Religion 
He is a Christian.

References

Ghanaian MPs 2017–2021
1970 births
Living people
New Patriotic Party politicians
Abuakwa State College alumni
Alumni of the Accra Academy